wmctrl is a command used to control windows in EWMH- and NetWM-compatible X Window window managers.  Some of its common operations are list, resize, and close window.  It also has the ability to interact with virtual desktops and give information about the window manager.  wmctrl is a command-line program, however, it has some functions that allow the mouse to select a window for an operation.

Operations
wmctrl operations
List all desktops
List all windows
Switch desktop of a window
Close window
Resize window
Move window
Set window's icon name
Set window title
Add, remove, or toggle windows properties
modal
sticky
maximized_vert
maximized_horz
shaded
skip_taskbar
skip_pager, hidden
fullscreen
above
below
Move window to another desktop
Change geometry (common size) of desktops
Display information about the window manager
Change number of desktops

Compatible window managers
Compatible, or mostly compatible, window managers
 Blackbox ≥ version 0.70
 IceWM
 KWin (the default WM for KDE)
 Metacity (the default WM for GNOME 2, replaced by Mutter in GNOME 3)
 Openbox ≥ 3 (the default WM of Lubuntu)
 sawfish
 FVWM ≥ 2.5
 waimea
 PekWM
 enlightenment ≥ 0.16.6
 Xfwm ≥ 4 (the default WM for Xfce)
 Fluxbox ≥ 0.9.6
 matchbox
 Window Maker ≥ 0.91
 compiz
 Awesome
 Xmonad
 Qubes
 Qtile

References

External links
 
 Extended Window Manager Hints (EWMH)
 NetWM

Application programming interfaces
X Window System
Computing commands